Robert Frenier is an American politician who served in the Vermont House of Representatives from 2017 to 2019. He is an Eagle Scout and served in the Marines, He is a former news editor of the Bedford Minuteman newspaper.

References

Living people
Tufts University alumni
21st-century American politicians
Members of the Vermont House of Representatives
Year of birth missing (living people)